The 2019–20 Vijay Hazare Trophy is the 18th season of the Vijay Hazare Trophy, a List A cricket tournament in India. It is being contested by 38 teams, divided into four groups, with ten teams in Plate Group. The group stage started on 24 September 2019. The top team in the Plate Group progressed to the quarter-finals of the competition.

Seventeen out of the first thirty matches that were scheduled to be played across all four groups were abandoned or finished in a no result. Therefore, the Board of Control for Cricket in India (BCCI) issued a revised schedule for the rain-affected matches. The statistics for cancelled matches were revoked leading to Rongsen Jonathan missing out on his maiden hundred in List A cricket.

After the final group matches, Pondicherry finished top of the Plate Group to progress to the knockout phase of the tournament.

Points table

Fixtures

Round 1

Round 2

Round 3

Round 4

Round 5

Round 6

Round 7

Round 8

Round 9

Round 10

Round 11

Round 12

Round 13

Round 14

Round 15

Round 16

Round 17

References

Vijay Hazare Trophy
Vijay Hazare Trophy
Vijay Hazare Trophy